is a Japanese football player. Ando currently plays club football for the Urawa Reds Diamonds. She previously played for the Japan national team before retiring in 2015.

Club career
Ando was born in Utsunomiya on 9 July 1982. In 2002, when she was a University of Tsukuba student, she left university club and joined Saitama Reinas FC (later Urawa Reds). In 2002 season, she scored 10 goals and she was selected Young Player Awards. She became top scorer and she was selected MVP awards in 2004 and 2009. She was also selected Best Eleven 6 times. From 2010, she played for German Bundesliga club Duisburg, Frankfurt and Essen. At Frankfurt, she won UEFA Women's Champions League in 2014–15 season. In June 2017, she returned to Japan and joined Urawa Reds.

National team career
In June 1999, when Ando was 16 years old, she was selected for Japan national team for the 1999 FIFA Women's World Cup. At this competition, on 26 June, she debuted against Norway. She played in the World Cup four times and in the Summer Olympics three times. She was a member of the team that defeated the United States in a penalty shootout in the finals to win the 2011 World Cup; Ando started the final. She was also part of the Japanese team which won the silver medal at the 2012 Summer Olympics and second place at the 2015 World Cup. At the 2015 World Cup, in the first match against Switzerland, she got a penalty kick, but she fractured her left ankle at that moment. This match was her last as part of the Japan national team. She played 126 games and scored 19 goals for Japan by 2015.

Education
Ando graduated from Utsunomiya Women's High School. She earned a PhD in Physical Education, Health and Sport Sciences from University of Tsukuba in May 2018.

Club statistics

1Includes UEFA Champions League.

National team statistics

International goals

Honors

Club
Urawa Reds Ladies
L.League: Winner 2004, 2009

FCR 2001 Duisburg
DFB-Pokal: Winner 2009–10

Frankfurt
DFB-Pokal: Winner 2013–14
UEFA Women's Champions League: Winner 2014–15

National team
FIFA Women's World Cup: Winner 2011

Individual
L.League
MVP: 2004, 2009
Top Scorers: 2004, 2009
Best Eleven (6): 2002, 2004, 2005, 2007, 2008, 2009
Best Young Player: 2002

References

External links

Japan Football Association

1982 births
Living people
University of Tsukuba alumni
Association football people from Tochigi Prefecture
Japanese women's footballers
Japan women's international footballers
Nadeshiko League players
Urawa Red Diamonds Ladies players
Japanese expatriates in Germany
Expatriate women's footballers in Germany
FCR 2001 Duisburg players
1. FFC Frankfurt players
1999 FIFA Women's World Cup players
2007 FIFA Women's World Cup players
2011 FIFA Women's World Cup players
2015 FIFA Women's World Cup players
FIFA Women's World Cup-winning players
Olympic footballers of Japan
Olympic silver medalists for Japan
Olympic medalists in football
Medalists at the 2012 Summer Olympics
Footballers at the 2004 Summer Olympics
Footballers at the 2008 Summer Olympics
Footballers at the 2012 Summer Olympics
Asian Games medalists in football
Footballers at the 2006 Asian Games
FIFA Century Club
People from Utsunomiya, Tochigi
Asian Games silver medalists for Japan
Women's association football forwards
Medalists at the 2006 Asian Games
Nadeshiko League MVPs